Daniel Davis (born 1945) is an American actor.

Daniel, Danny or Dan Davis may also refer to:

Arts and entertainment
Daniel Davis Jr. (1813–1887), American photographer
Danny Davis (country musician) (1925–2008), American country music band leader, trumpet player and vocalist
Dan Davis (broadcaster) (born 1942), American radio personality
Dan Davis (writer) (born 1953), American writer
Daniel Davis, pseudonym used by Ed Wood in Glen or Glenda

Politics
Daniel F. Davis (1843–1897), American politician, Maine governor, 1880–1881
Danny K. Davis (born 1941), U.S. Representative from Illinois
Daniel Davis (Florida politician) (born 1973), American politician, Republican member of the Florida House of Representatives
Dan Davis, American candidate in the United States House of Representatives elections in Michigan, 2010
Daniel Davis (Massachusetts lawyer), American Solicitor General for the Commonwealth of Massachusetts

Sports
Nightmare Danny Davis (born 1952), American former professional wrestler and referee
Dangerous Danny Davis (born 1956), American former professional wrestling referee and wrestler
Dan Davis (defensive lineman) (born 1986), American football defensive lineman
Dan Davis (American football coach), American football coach 
Danny Davis (snowboarder) (born 1988), American snowboarder
Dan Davis (rugby union) (born 1998), Welsh rugby union player

Others
Daniel C. Davis (1804–1850), American captain in the Mormon Battalion
Daniel Davis (bishop) (1788–1857), first Anglican Bishop of Antigua
Daniel M. Davis, English professor of immunology and author of The Compatibility Gene

See also
Daniel Davies (disambiguation)
Dan David (businessman) (1929–2011), Romanian Israeli businessman
David Daniel Davis (1777–1841), British physician
Davis Daniel (born 1961), country music artist